Lowercase People Records (stylized lowercase people records) is the record label founded and run by the members of the band Switchfoot. It was founded after the band split with their major label, Columbia/Sony BMG. The label's name was drawn from the lyrics of the song "Company Car" from the album New Way to be Human.

Formation
In October 2007, Jon Foreman announced on Switchfoot's official YouTube account page the formation of lowercase people records. This development came about some time after the band cut ties with their major label, Columbia Records.

First Release: Rebuild
On November 1, 2007, lowercase people records released its first song, "Rebuild", a song written by Switchfoot's Jon Foreman and Relient K's Matt Thiessen for their 2007 Appetite for Construction Tour. It was offered as a free download, with options to donate either time or money to Habitat for Humanity.

Distribution
lowercase people records has deals in place with Atlantic Records to distribute Switchfoot records and Credential Recordings/EMI CMG to distribute Jon Foreman and Switchfoot releases to CCM. Both labels work simultaneously under the banner company lowercase people records.

Artists
Artists currently "signed" to lowercase people records are:

Switchfoot
Jon Foreman
Fiction Family

References

 
American independent record labels
Companies based in San Diego